Danylo Pavlovych Sydorenko (born 13 January 2003) is a Ukrainian professional footballer who plays as a centre-back for Ukrainian club Kremin Kremenchuk.

Career
In February 2023 he moved on loan to Horishni Plavni.

References

External links
 

2003 births
Living people
Place of birth missing (living people)
Ukrainian footballers
Association football defenders
FC Inhulets Petrove players
FC Kolos Kovalivka players
FC Kremin Kremenchuk players
Tarnovia Tarnów players
Ukrainian First League players
IV liga players
Ukrainian expatriate footballers
Expatriate footballers in Poland
Ukrainian expatriate sportspeople in Poland